"Buwan" is a song written and sung by Filipino actor, singer and songwriter, Juan Karlos Labajo. Under the band name Juan Karlos, it was released on June 22, 2018, through MCA Music. The song became one of the most played OPM songs of 2018, winning Song of the Year at the 2019 Myx Music Awards, 2019 Awit Award for People's Voice Favorite Song. "Buwan" received huge popularity and started as a song challenge through social media platforms in the Philippines even overseas.

Live performances 
Labajo premiered "Buwan" during his concert on May 19, 2019. He also performed the song on Mutia Ti Bauang 2019 (beauty pageant). Labajo also performed it during Rakrakan Festival 2019 and at GMMSF Awards Night and various malls in the Philippines. He also made a kundiman version (a genre of traditional Filipino love songs) of the song with his band

Music video 
The music video shows Labajo tying and blindfolding a woman (Maureen Wroblewitz) inside a dim room as he manages their adoration disdain relationship. In the video, Labajo acts being aggressive and fans said that it symbolizes serious and intense love towards her. Fans also searched at the other word of his song which is "Buwan", and they found the word "Luna" and said that that's why Labajo acts being aggressive and lunatic to a woman. The official music video was released and posted on YouTube on September 24, 2018. As of November 5, 2020, the music video has garnered over 144 million views, the music video reached 40 million in two months. It is also the most liked and most viewed OPM music video in 2018 with 144 million views, surpassing Yeng Constantino's "Ikaw" which had over 105 million views.

Notable covers 
 Regine Velasquez performed her version on ASAP stage.
 Angeline Quinto uploaded her version on her Youtube Channel.
 Bugoy Drilon performed buwan reggae version and uploaded on his Youtube Channel.

Awards

References 

2018 songs
2018 singles
Internet memes introduced in 2018